Seah may refer to:

Seah (surname), a surname in various cultures
Seah (unit), a unit of dry volume of ancient origin used in Jewish law
Seah Holdings, a South Korean conglomerate
Sexual Exploitation and Abuse and Sexual Harassment

See also
Seay, a surname
Shea (disambiguation)
Siah (disambiguation)